Edwin Vedejs (January 31, 1941 – December 2, 2017) was a Latvian-American professor of chemistry. In 1967, he joined the organic chemistry faculty at University of Wisconsin. He rose through the ranks during his 32 years at Wisconsin being named Helfaer Professor (1991–1996) and Robert M. Bock Professor (1997–1998). In 1999, he moved to the University of Michigan and served as the Moses Gomberg Collegiate Professor of Chemistry for the final 13 years of his tenure. He was elected a fellow of the American Chemical Society in 2011. After his retirement in 2011, the University of Michigan established the Edwin Vedejs Collegiate Professor of Chemistry Chair. Vedejs died on December 2, 2017, in Madison, Wisconsin.

Early life and education
Edwin "Ed" Vedejs was born in Riga, Latvia to Velta (nee Robežnieks) and Nikolajs Vedējs. Not long after his birth, the German occupation of Latvia during World War II occurred followed by the Soviet re-occupation of Latvia in 1944. These events forced his family to settle in the Fischbach Displaced Persons camp in Germany for six years. In 1950, they emigrated to the United States and first settled in Fort Atkinson, WI. They eventually moved to Grand Rapids, MI.

He attended Grand Rapids Junior College for a few years before transferring to the University of Michigan where he received a BS degree in 1962. He moved to the University of Wisconsin and joined the group of Professor  for his Ph.D. studies (Progress toward the total synthesis of terramycin), which he completed in 1966. From 1966–67, he did post-doctoral research on the total synthesis of prostaglandins at Harvard University in the laboratory of Nobel Laureate Professor E. J. Corey.

Research

Vedejs' main areas of research focus included organic synthesis methodologies and reaction mechanisms. His group targeted the synthesis of several natural products, such as retronecine, mitomycin, and cytochalasin, but the completion of a total synthesis was always secondary to the main goal of exploring new methodologies. His mechanistic research of the Wittig reaction revealed the importance of the oxaphosphetane. The application of heteroatoms such as nitrogen, sulfur, phosphorus, boron, silicon and tin were often prominently featured, which has been summarized in his self-penned account of his work. Vedejs also tackled a wide range of methodologies aimed at stereoselective synthesis including protonation of carbanions, acylation and alkylation of achiral and prochiral nucleophiles, parallel kinetic resolution, and control of configuration by crystallization-induced asymmetric transformation.

Over the course of his career, Vedejs published over 230 peer-reviewed articles. He served as an associate editor of the Journal of the American Chemical Society from 1994 to 1999, as chair of the NIH Medicinal Chemistry Study Section from 1990 to 1991, as chair of the Organic Division of the American Chemical Society in 2003, and as a member of the Organic Syntheses Board of Editors from 1980 to 1988. He served as editor (along with Scott E. Denmark) of the three volume series Lewis Base Catalysis in Organic Synthesis. Over the course of his 45 years in academia, he mentored over 80 doctoral students, and numerous post-doctoral fellows and undergraduates.

Awards and honors
Alfred P. Sloan Research Fellowship, 1971–1973
Alexander von Humboldt Senior Scientist Award, 1984
Member of the Latvian Academy of Sciences, 1992
Paul Walden Medal, 1997
Herbert C. Brown Award for Creative Research in Synthetic Methods, 2004
Grand Medal of the Latvian Academy of Sciences, 2005
Order of the Three Stars, Republic of Latvia, 2006
Elected fellow of the American Chemical Society, 2011

Selected publications

References

External links
Edwin Vedejs biography from Scripps Research
Total Synthesis of Zygosporin E (Vedejs) from University of Wisconsin, Prof. Reich, Total Syntheses
Total Synthesis of Retronecine (Vedejs) from University of Wisconsin, Prof. Reich, Total Syntheses
Report of Faculty Retirement, Edwin Vedejs, Ph.D. from University of Michigan
Edwin Vedejs from the University of Michigan Faculty History Project

1941 births
2017 deaths
Latvian emigrants to the United States
Organic chemists
Fellows of the American Chemical Society
University of Michigan alumni
University of Wisconsin–Madison alumni
University of Wisconsin–Madison faculty
Scientists from Riga
Latvian World War II refugees
University of Michigan faculty